is a passenger railway station located in Naka-ku, in the city of Okayama, Okayama Prefecture, Japan. It is operated by West Japan Railway Company (JR West). Although the official name of the station is Nishigawara, signage at the station shows the name  to mention the nearby Shujitsu University.

Lines
Nishigawara Station is served by the San'yō Main Line an is 140.8 km from the starting of the Sanyo Main Line at Kōbe Station.

Layout
The station has two elevated opposed side platforms, with the station facilities underneath the tracks. The station is unattended.

Platforms

History
Nishigawara station opened on 15 March 2008.

Passenger statistics
In fiscal 2019, the station was used by an average of 3873 passengers daily

Surrounding area
Shujitsu University/Shujitsu Junior College
Okayama Prefectural Okayama Sozan Junior and Senior High School
Okayama Municipal Uno Elementary School
Okayama City Naka Ward Office

See also
 List of railway stations in Japan

References

External links

  

Stations of West Japan Railway Company
Railway stations in Okayama
Sanyō Main Line
Railway stations in Japan opened in 2008